David Johnson Vann (August 10, 1928 – June 9, 2000) was mayor of Birmingham, Alabama.

Vann was born in Randolph County, Alabama. He graduated from the University of Alabama in 1950, and from the university's law school in 1951. He served as clerk to United States Supreme Court Justice Hugo Black, and was present in the courtroom when the court handed down the 1954 Brown v. Board of Education school desegregation decision. After completing his term as court clerk Vann settled in Birmingham and joined the law firm of White, Bradley, Arant, All and Rose. In 1963 Vann helped organize a referendum that changed Birmingham's form of government from a three-member commission to a mayor and nine-member council. Vann served as a special assistant to Birmingham mayor Albert Boutwell under the new city government.

In 1971 Vann was elected to the Birmingham city council. That same year he helped lead an unsuccessful campaign, known as "One Great City," to consolidate the city governments of Birmingham and its suburbs into a single countywide municipal government. Vann was elected mayor of Birmingham in 1975 and served one term, losing his bid for reelection to Richard Arrington, Jr. In 1980 Vann became a lobbyist and special counsel to Arrington, and served two terms as chair of the Birmingham Water Works and Sewer Board. As counsel to the mayor Vann oversaw an aggressive annexation campaign, adding substantial areas south of Birmingham to the city limits and frustrating efforts by several Birmingham suburbs to block the city's growth. Vann was active in civic organizations and was a founding board member of the Birmingham Civil Rights Institute.

David Vann died in Birmingham.

See also 
List of law clerks of the Supreme Court of the United States (Seat 1)

References

External links 
 “Eyes on the Prize; Interview with David Vann,”  1985-11-01, American Archive of Public Broadcasting

1928 births
2000 deaths
University of Alabama alumni
Auburn High School (Alabama) alumni
People from Randolph County, Alabama
Mayors of Birmingham, Alabama
Law clerks of the Supreme Court of the United States
Alabama city council members
20th-century American politicians